The Olympus M.Zuiko Digital ED 14-42mm F3.5-5.6 EZ is a pancake standard zoom lens for Micro Four Thirds. It was announced by Olympus Corporation on January 29, 2014.

References
http://www.dpreview.com/products/olympus/lenses/olympus_m_14-42_3p5-5p6_ez/specifications

Camera lenses introduced in 2014
14-42mm F3.5-5.6 EZ
Pancake lenses